Sushitsa (Сушица) is a village in Treklyano Municipality, Kyustendil Province, south-western Bulgaria.

References

Villages in Kyustendil Province